Snarumselva is a river in Buskerud county (now merged with Viken county), Norway. It flows north to south from Krøderen, a lake in Krødsherad municipality, to Geithus, a village in Modum municipality, where it joins the Drammenselva river.

There are two hydroelectric power plants along Snarumselva, both located on natural waterfalls. The second, Kaggefoss Power Plant, is located on Kaggefoss, approximately two kilometres north of the terminus at Geithus. The portion of the river that runs from Kaggefoss to the terminus at Geithus is also sometimes called Kista.

Ramfoss 

Operation began on July 27, 1961, and the plant was expanded June 20, 1970.

The power plant is operated by Midt Nett Buskerud AS and is owned by Modum municipality (36.35%), Krødsherad municipality (18.17%), Sigdal municipality (9.48%) and Buskerud county (36%).

Kaggefoss 

The terrain nearby mostly consists of closed broad-leaved deciduous forests. 

Kaggefoss Power Plant (Kaggefoss kraftstasjon) is located on the falls. It became operational in 1951 and was upgraded in 1999. The power station belongs to EB Power AS, a subsidiary of Energy Buskerud.

References 

Rivers of Viken
Hydroelectric power stations in Norway
Waterfalls of Norway